Joel and Ethan Coen, collectively referred to as the Coen brothers, are American filmmakers. Their films span many genres and styles, which they frequently subvert or parody. The brothers write, direct and produce their films jointly, and have edited almost all of them under the collective pseudonym Roderick Jaynes.

The Coen brothers have been nominated for thirteen Academy Awards together, and individually for one award each, winning Best Original Screenplay for Fargo and Best Picture, Best Director and Best Adapted Screenplay for No Country for Old Men. The duo also won the Palme d'Or for Barton Fink (1991) and were nominated for Fargo.

Films

As screenwriters
In addition to their own films, the Coen brothers have also contributed to others' films.

As executive producers

Solo work

Joel

Film

Ethan

Film

As writer

Theater

As writer

Literature

See also 
 The Jesus Rolls (2019) – A remake of Going Places written and directed by John Turturro as a spinoff of the Coens' The Big Lebowski.

Notes

References

Director filmographies